Michael Wayne Milchin (born February 28, 1968) is a former Major League Baseball pitcher who played for one season. He played for the Minnesota Twins for 26 games during the 1996 season and the Baltimore Orioles for 13 games during the 1996 season.

Biography

Milchin was born in Knoxville, Tennessee, and is Jewish. He attended John Randolph Tucker High School in Richmond, Virginia, and played at Clemson University. In 1987, he played collegiate summer baseball with the Orleans Cardinals of the Cape Cod Baseball League. He was on the Gold Medal Team USA at the 1988 Summer Olympic Games.

He played for the Minnesota Twins for 26 games during the 1996 season and the Baltimore Orioles for 13 games during the 1996 season. He had been claimed off waivers by the Orioles from the Twins on August 8, 1996. He was left off the Orioles roster for the 1996 postseason in favor of Arthur Rhodes. He was released by the Orioles on November 19, 1996.

Milchin is as of 2020 the Player Representative; Baseball, of Independent Sports & Entertainment.

References

External links

1968 births
Living people
Albuquerque Dukes players
Arkansas Travelers players
Baltimore Orioles players
Clemson Tigers baseball players
Orleans Firebirds players
Hamilton Redbirds players
Louisville Redbirds players
Major League Baseball pitchers
Baseball players from Knoxville, Tennessee
Minnesota Twins players
Salt Lake Buzz players
Springfield Cardinals players
St. Petersburg Cardinals players
Medalists at the 1988 Summer Olympics
Olympic gold medalists for the United States in baseball
Jewish American baseball players
Jewish Major League Baseball players
Baseball players at the 1988 Summer Olympics
21st-century American Jews